RNA-binding protein 34 is a protein that in humans is encoded by the RBM34 gene.

References

Further reading